The Turkestan Autonomous Soviet Socialist Republic (initially, the Turkestan Socialist Federative Republic; 30 April 191827 October 1924) was an autonomous republic of the Russian Soviet Federative Socialist Republic located in Soviet Central Asia. Uzbeks were the preeminent nation of Turkestan ASSR. Tashkent was the capital and largest city in the region. 

During the Russian Empire, the Turkestan ASSR's territory was governed as Turkestan Krai, the Emirate of Bukhara, and the Khanate of Khiva. From 1905, Pan-Turkist ideologues like Ismail Gasprinski aimed to suppress differences among the peoples who spoke Turkic languages, uniting them into one government.

This idea was supported by Vladimir Lenin, and after the Russian Revolution of 1917, the Bolsheviks in Tashkent created the Turkestan ASSR. But in February 1918, the Islamic Council and the Council of Intelligentsia (Uzb. Shuroi Ulammo) met in Kokand city and declared a rival Turkestan Autonomous Republic, battling Bolshevik forces until the 1920s as part of the conservative Basmachi rebellion.

The Turkestan Soviet Federative Republic was officially proclaimed on 30 April 1918.

In the late 1917, the TSFR was cut off from the RSFSR by the revolt of the Orenburg Cossacks, but held out, despite being surrounded by hostile states, until the arrival of the Red Army in September 1919 after the Counteroffensive of Eastern Front.

Meanwhile, a power struggle among the Communists ensued between those favoring a Pan-Turkist government like Turar Ryskulov and Tursun Khojaev, and those in favor of dividing Soviet Turkestan into smaller ethnic or regional units, such as Fayzulla Khodzhayev and Akmal Ikramov. The latter group won, as national delimitation in Central Asia began in 1924. Upon dissolution, the Turkestan ASSR was split into Uzbek SSR (now Uzbekistan), Turkmen SSR (now Turkmenistan) with the Tajik ASSR (now Tajikistan), Kara-Kirghiz Autonomous Oblast (now Kyrgyzstan), and Karakalpak Autonomous Oblast (now Autonomous Republic of Uzbekistan as Karakalpakstan).

Flag

Chairmen of the Central Executive Committee 

Kobozev, Pyotr Alekseevich (April – May 1918), Solkin, Andrey Fedorovich, contributor (April – 2 June 1918)
Tobolin, Ivan Osipovich (2 June – 5 October 1918)
Votintsev, Vsevolod Dmitrievich (October 1918 – 19 January 1919)
– (19 January – 31 March 1919)
Kazakov, Aristarkh Andreevich (31 March – July 1919)
Kobozev, Pyotr Alekseevich (July – September 1919)
Apin, Ivan Andreevich (September 1919 – January 1920) 
Ryskulov, Turar Ryskulovich (January – 21 July 1920)
Biserov, Mukhammedzhan (21 July – August 1920) 
Rakhimbaev, Abdullo Rakhimbaevich (4 August 1920 – May 1921), Khodzhanov Sultanbek, acting, prev. (12 May 1920 – ?) 
Tyuryakulov, Nazir Tyuryakulovich (May 1921 – June 1922)
Rakhimbaev, Abdullo Rakhimbaevich (June – October 1922)
Khidir-Aliev, Inagadzhan (October 1922 – 1 January 1924), Dadabaev Butabay, vrid. prev. (August – September 1923) 
Aytakov, Nedirbai (9 January – November 1924)

Turksovnarkom
Chairmen of the Council of People's Commissars ("Turksovnarkom").

References

External links
Uzbekistan at worldstatesmen.org, accessed 23 July 2009.
AUTONOMOUS TURKESTAN SOCIALIST. THE SOVIET REPUBLIC

Autonomous republics of the Russian Soviet Federative Socialist Republic
Early Soviet republics
Soviet Central Asia
States and territories established in 1918
States and territories disestablished in 1924
Communism in Kyrgyzstan
20th century in Kyrgyzstan
Communism in Uzbekistan
20th century in Uzbekistan
Communism in Turkmenistan
20th century in Turkmenistan
Communism in Tajikistan
20th century in Tajikistan
1918 establishments in Russia
1924 disestablishments in the Soviet Union
Former socialist republics
Post–Russian Empire states